The 2012 Valencian Community motorcycle Grand Prix was the eighteenth and final round of the 2012 Grand Prix motorcycle racing season. It took place on the weekend of 9–11 November 2012 at the Circuito Ricardo Tormo.

The race was Casey Stoner's last before his retirement from the sport, and he finished it on the podium in third position. Dani Pedrosa won the race for Honda and ensure the season ended with 18 points between himself and new champion Jorge Lorenzo, who retired from the race, at the top of the riders' standings. The result meant that Pedrosa had won 6 of the last 8 races, and that Lorenzo maintained his record of finishing first or second in every race he finished in 2012. Katsuyuki Nakasuga made just his second appearance in 2012 in place of the injured Ben Spies at Yamaha, and took advantage of the wet conditions to finish in second place (the only podium for a Japanese rider in any class in 2012).

Marc Márquez won the Moto2 race, despite starting from 33rd on the grid, although he had moved up to 13th within the first three corners. It was Márquez's last Moto2 race, as he would replace Stoner at the Honda team for the 2013 season. Polesitter Pol Espargaró secured second in the championship behind Márquez by finishing in eighth. Julián Simón and Nicolás Terol (who took his first Moto2 podium) completed an all Spanish podium. Danny Kent took his second victory of the Moto3 season in front of champion Sandro Cortese and Zulfahmi Khairuddin to complete an all KTM podium.

Classification

MotoGP

Moto2

Moto3

Notes
Marc Márquez's comeback from 33rd to the win was the biggest comeback in all of the history in the Championship.

Dani Pedrosa, who made the pole position in MotoGP, started the race from the pit lane because he entered to the boxes for a bike change because the tarmac was drying, like Alvaro Bautista, Nicky Hayden and Cal Crutchlow. The Spanish rider, despite this, won the race after Jorge Lorenzo crashed heavily when the Yamaha rider tried to lap James Ellison.

Championship standings after the race (MotoGP)
Below are the standings for the top five riders and constructors after round eighteen has concluded.

Riders' Championship standings

Constructors' Championship standings

 Note: Only the top five positions are included for both sets of standings.

References

Valencian Community motorcycle Grand Prix
Valencian
Valencian motorcycle
21st century in Valencia
Valencian Grand Prix